Vandré may refer to:

Vandré Sagrilo Monteiro, (born 1979), a Brazilian footballer
Geraldo Vandré (born 1935), a Brazilian singer, composer and guitar player
Vandré, Charente-Maritime, a commune in western France

See also 
 Vandre (disambiguation)